Helen Jennifer "Jenny" Horton (née Pritchard) is a former English badminton player.

Badminton career
Born Helen Jennifer Pritchard  she first competed as Pritchard when she won the mixed doubles title at the 1964 All England Open Badminton Championships, with Tony Jordan. In addition she won the German Open in 1964.

After marrying fellow international player David Horton in 1965 she competed as Jenny Horton and won the U.S. Open Badminton Championships and the South African Championships in 1965 and from 1966 to 1968 won four titles at the Scottish Open.

Horton was selected as part of the England team that went to 1966 British Empire and Commonwealth Games and won a gold medal, with Ursula Smith in the women's doubles and a silver medal, with Tony Jordan in the mixed doubles.

References

English female badminton players
1938 births
Living people
Commonwealth Games gold medallists for England
Commonwealth Games silver medallists for England
Commonwealth Games medallists in badminton
Badminton players at the 1966 British Empire and Commonwealth Games
Medallists at the 1966 British Empire and Commonwealth Games